Chris Walsh (born 5 June 1962) is an Australian former professional rugby league footballer who played in the 1980s and 1990s. A New South Wales State of Origin forward, he played club football for the St. George Dragons and Illawarra Steelers.

Playing career
As a 19-year-old in 1981, Walsh moved from Port Kembla to Kogarah and played five seasons at the St. George Dragons between 1982 and 1986. He was selected to represent New South Wales as a second-rower for game III 
of the 1984 State of Origin series.

Walsh returned to Illawarra in 1987 and became captain of the Steelers. Despite injuring two vertebrae in his neck during a game in 1987, Walsh played on and was named Clubman of the Year in 1988 and 1989. He captained the Steelers to their first trophy in 1992 - the pre-season Tooheys Challenge Cup. A knee ligament injury eventually led to his retirement after just 2 rounds in the 1992 season.

References

Sources

External links
Chris Walsh at yesterdayshero.com.au

1962 births
Living people
Australian rugby league players
New South Wales Rugby League State of Origin players
St. George Dragons players
Illawarra Steelers players
Rugby league players from Port Kembla, New South Wales
Rugby league second-rows